The Cooper T83 is an open-wheel formula racing car, designed, developed and built by British manufacturer Cooper, for Formula 3 categories, in 1966.  It was an evolution of the previous T76. It was powered by a  BMC four-cylinder engine, developing  @ 7,750 rpm, which had a 12.5:1 compression ratio.  The chassis used was a tubular space frame, while the body was constructed as a semi-stressed skin. The front suspension was altered to widen the front track and minimise the leverage rate of the front shock absorbers. The rear suspension was also totally reworked, to equal the symmetry of the T81 Formula One car. The car was not successful. It suffered severe understeer, due to the undertray of the car being "flat-bottomed" in design (compared to the original "round-bottomed" design), almost creating aerodynamic vortices under the car, and affecting its ground effect properties. Only 7 models were produced. A developmental version of the car used a larger Cosworth SCB Formula Two engine. It entered more than 5 races, and claimed one pole position, but didn't finish that particular race; with the wheel coming off, and achieved no further success after that.

References

Cooper racing cars
1960s cars
Cars of England
Formula Three cars
Open wheel racing cars